Michael Nesmith began recording music in 1963. In his early career, Nesmith went under the pseudonym Michael Blessing. In 1966, Nesmith was cast in The Monkees, where he is largely known as his Monkees' persona "Mike". Of the twelve studio albums The Monkees released, Nesmith performed, produced, and wrote songs on ten of the albums. As a solo artist, Nesmith's musical library includes 13 studio albums, a movie soundtrack, and an instrumental album of his songs, which consists of both solo works and works by the First National Band, which Nesmith fronted in the early 1970s. His library of music was primarily recorded on either RCA Records or his own label, Pacific Arts.

Albums

Album

Live albums

Compilation albums

Reissue albums

Promotional albums

Singles

Nesmith recorded "The World is Golden Too" in 1975 for the Japanese movie Blue Angels. An edited version of this song was released as a 45. The uncut version appears on the soundtrack.

MP3 single songs
In 2011, Nesmith began releasing new recordings as MP3 downloads from his website, Videoranch.com. The songs are available under two headings (or album collections): Iteration and Around the Sun. As each song is updated and remixed, Nesmith has released the updated version. In addition to the new music, Nesmith also releases live songs and alternate mixes of songs from previous albums.

References

External links
 
  as Michael Nesmith & The First National Band

Discographies of American artists
Discography